Musaabad-e Bakhtiari (also Romanized as Mūsáābād-e Bakhtīārī and Mūsáābād-e Bakhtīār) is a village in Behnamvasat-e Jonubi Rural District, Javadabad District, Varamin County, Tehran Province, Iran. At the 2006 census, its population was 846, in 206 families.

References 

Populated places in Varamin County